Major-General Sir William Godwin Michelmore,  (14 March 1894 – 25 October 1982) was a senior British Army officer who served in both world wars and was later aide-de-camp to King George VI and Lord Mayor of Exeter.

Early life and military career
Godwin Michelmore was born in Exeter, Devon, and educated at Rugby School. During the First World War, Michelmore was commissioned as a second lieutenant into the British Army's Royal Engineers and fought in the Battle of Passchendaele, where he was wounded. By the end of the war, Michelmore had been promoted to acting major and had been awarded the Military Cross (MC) and had been twice mentioned in despatches.

From 1920 to 1929 he commanded the Exeter-based 43rd (Wessex) Divisional Signals in the Territorial Army (TA), first as a Major, then as Lieutenant-Colonel.

At the beginning of the Second World War, Michelmore commanded 134th Infantry Brigade, a second-line TA brigade raised in Devon. From 30 October 1941 to the end of the war he commanded the Devon and Cornwall County Division (later re-designated successively as the 77th Infantry Division, 77th Infantry (Reserve) Division,  77th Holding Division, and finally the 45th Holding Division). Michelmore also served as Aide-de-camp (ADC) to King George VI between 1942 and 1947.

In retirement he served as Lord Mayor of Exeter from 1949 to 1950.

Michelmore was appointed a Companion of the Order of the Bath in 1945 and created a Knight Commander of the Order of the British Empire in 1953.

In early 1971 he married Winsome Montgomery, one of Bernard Montgomery's sisters.

References

Sources
Obituary of Major-Gen Sir G. Michelmore, The Times, Saturday, 30 October 1982 (pg. 10; Issue 61376; col F)
1911 UK census
 
 
 Maj-Gen R.F.H. Nalder, The Royal Corps of Signals: A History of its Antecedents and Developments (Circa 1800–1955), London: Royal Signals Institution, 1958.

External links
Generals of World War II

1894 births
1982 deaths
British Army generals of World War II
Companions of the Order of the Bath
Knights Commander of the Order of the British Empire
Companions of the Distinguished Service Order
Recipients of the Military Cross
British Army personnel of World War I
Mayors of Exeter
Royal Engineers officers
Royal Corps of Signals officers
People educated at Rugby School
British Army major generals
Military personnel from Exeter